Metten Abbey, or St. Michael's Abbey at Metten (in German Abtei Metten or Kloster Metten) is a house of the Benedictine Order in Metten near Deggendorf, situated between the fringes of the Bavarian Forest and the valley of the Danube, in Bavaria in Germany.

History

The abbey was founded in around 766 by Gamelbert of Michaelsbuch. For many centuries Metten was under the lordship of the Dukes and Electors of Bavaria. When Charlemagne stayed in Regensburg for three years after 788, Utto turned his abbey over to the Frankish ruler, making the Ducal Abbey a Royal Abbey. After the Carolingians became extinct, Metten was turned into an Imperial Abbey. Besides the work of land clearance in the Bavarian border territories, the monks were very active in education. Members of the abbey were not only schoolteachers, but also members of the Bavarian Academy of Science in Munich and professors of philosophy and theology in Freising and Salzburg. Gerhard, Bishop of Passau was abbot in the 10th century. 

After secularisation in 1803 the abbey's property was confiscated, and by 1815 had all been auctioned off. Over a number of years Johann von Pronath acquired the greater part of the former premises and succeeded in persuading King Ludwig I of Bavaria in 1830 to re-establish the monastery, which by 1837 had been set up to incorporate a boarding school (Gymnasium), in continuance of its educational traditions, which the monastery has run to this day.

The re-founded abbey was very active in re-settling new monasteries. In 1846 Boniface Wimmer left from Metten to establish the Benedictines in the United States and founded Saint Vincent Archabbey in Latrobe, Pennsylvania. Monks from Latrobe in turn founded Saint John's Abbey in Minnesota, and the adjoining Saint John's University.
Since 1858 Metten has been a member of the Bavarian Congregation of the Benedictine Confederation.

During World War II, more than 1,000 refugees from the East found shelter at Metten, located just 30 miles from the Czechoslovak border. "The last days of the war saw heavy fighting for the nearby bridges on the Danube, where SS troops held out against approaching U.S. forces. Elsewhere, an advance of combat forces was usually preceded by bombing, but none took place at Metten. Instead, American tank units spearheaded the attack, sparing the townspeople as well as the monastery from great destruction. Years later, the brothers at Metten learned that among the staff officers of the United States army unit that had marched into Metten were some who had studied at St. Vincent and St. John."
 
Besides the boarding school, the abbey runs various craft enterprises.

Dom Edmund Beck, a monk of Metten, edited many of the Syriac works of Saint Ephrem the Syrian in the Corpus Scriptorum Christianorum Orientalium.

School
Like many Benedictine abbeys in Europe, the monks ran a school for local boys. St.-Michaels-Gymnasium is a state recognised coeducational day and boarding school still run by the abbey. It is a Humanistisches ("humanist") and Neusprachliches ("languages") gymnasium, meaning that its curriculum specialises in the classics and modern languages. Notable alumni include educationist Aloys Fischer, diplomat Karl von Spreti, military officer Vincenz Müller and Karl-Josef Cardinal Rauber.

Library
The original library was established in the 1260s and was expanded over the years. The present library was constructed between 1722 and 1726 in the Baroque style by Abbot Roman II Märkl. At the time of secularization, many of the books were sent to municipal and university libraries. The library was used to store grain. Upon the abbey's reestablishment, some were returned; others were donated from estates or closed monasteries. Because so many monastic libraries had been confiscated, the monks found old manuscripts and early printed books on the market at reasonable prices.

A 1415 manuscript found in the abbey's library helped identify the meaning of the abbreviations for the Vade retro satana (Step back Satan) formula that appears on Saint Benedict Medals. The library, which is open for tours, contains over 150,000 volumes on theology, philosophy and history, including a 1434 illuminated volume of Gregorian chant hand-written on sheepskin parchment.

Gallery

Notes

References

Georg Aichinger: Kloster Metten und seine Umgebungen, Landshut 1859.
Benedikt Busch: Die Abtei Metten im Dritten Reich, in: Beiträge zur Geschichte des Bistums Regensburg 15 (1981) 333–362.
Georg Dehio – Handbuch der Deutschen Kunstdenkmäler. Bayern II: Niederbayern, bearbeitet von Michael Brix, mit Beiträgen von Franz Bischoff, Gerhard Hackl und Volker Liedke, München/Berlin 1988, 398–405.
Wilhelm Fink: Entwicklungsgeschichte der Benedictinerabtei Metten. Bd. 1: Das Profeßbuch der Abtei (Studien und Mitteilungen zur Geschichte des Benediktinerordens und seiner Zweige. Ergänzungsheft 1,1), München 1927.
Wilhelm Fink: Entwicklungsgeschichte der Benedictinerabtei Metten. Bd. 2: Das königliche Kloster (Studien und Mitteilungen zur Geschichte des Benediktinerordens und seiner Zweige. Ergänzungsheft 1,2), München 1928.
Wilhelm Fink: Entwicklungsgeschichte der Benedictinerabtei Metten. Bd. 3: Das landständische Kloster (1275–1803) (Studien und Mitteilungen zur Geschichte des Benediktinerordens und seiner Zweige. Ergänzungsheft 1,3), München 1930.
Wilhelm Fink: Die Benediktinerabtei Metten und ihre Beziehungen zur Kunst (Süddeutsche Kunstbücher, Bd. 21/22), Augsburg 1922.
Maurus Gandershofer:  Verdienste der Benediktiner von Metten um die Pflege der Wissenschaften und Künste. Eine den einstigen Bewohnern dieses Stiftes geweihte Rückerinnerung, Landshut 1841. 
Stephan Haering: Der Streit um die Mettener Abtwahl 1905, in: Anna Egler (Hg.): Dienst an Glaube und Recht (Festschrift für Georg May zum 80. Geburtstag), Berlin 2006, S. 105–198.
Michael Kaufmann: Säkularisation, Desolation und Restauration in der Benediktinerabtei Metten (1803–1840) (= Entwicklungsgeschichte der Benediktinerabtei Metten, Bd. 4), Metten 1993.
Michael Kaufmann: Memento Mori. Zum Gedenken an die verstorbenen Konventualen der Benediktinerabtei Metten seit der Wiedererrichtung 1830 (Entwicklungsgeschichte der Benediktinerabtei Metten, Bd. 5), Metten 2008.
Richard Loibl/Raban Schinabeck (eds.): 1200 Jahre Abtei Metten, Metten 1966.

External links
 Kloster Metten
 Kloster Metten
  Klöster in Bayern
 St Michael's Gymnasium at Metten Abbey

Benedictine monasteries in Germany
Monasteries in Bavaria
Christian monasteries established in the 8th century
8th-century establishments in Germany
Deggendorf (district)
Religious buildings and structures completed in 766